Anthia (common name saber-toothed ground beetles) is a genus of the ground beetle family (Carabidae).

In general, the beetles are large, armored and fast-moving, with prominent, powerful and sharp mandibles. Some are diurnal predators in semi-arid habitats, while others are nocturnal.

The genus is one of a group of similar taxa of predatory Carabidae that has been the subject of considerable nomenclatural confusion. Several species here and elsewhere included within the genus Anthia are occasionally referred to as belonging to the non-existent genus Thermophilum (e.g. Anthia fornasinii referred to as Thermophilum fornasinii), because the spelling has experienced a range of errors; the spelling that is valid under the ICZN and currently accepted is Termophilum but Thermophilum (an unjustified emendation of Termophilum) and Thermophila (a junior homonym of a valid genus name in the order Lepidoptera) have been variously used in the past, as well as the misspelling "Thermophilium".

Species

The genus Anthia includes the following species:

References

Anthiinae (beetle)
Carabidae genera